Aleph is a 1980s Italo disco band, featuring the vocals of Dave Rodgers. The other members of the group were Donato Bellini and Marco Manzi. They achieved a fair amount of success with the single "Fly To Me" in 1985, which reached the Top Ten in several countries. They released two LPs, "Black Out" in 1988 and "Take My Life" in 1989, both originally released on Time Records. The group later released three songs in the late 1990s.

Discography
Studio albums
  Black Out  (1988)
  Take My Life  (1989)

Singles

References 

Italian dance music groups
Italo disco groups